Hajizadeh is a surname. Notable people with the surname include:

Abolfazl Hajizadeh (born 1985), Iranian footballer
Adnan Hajizadeh (born 1983), Azerbaijani blogger
Elshan Hajizadeh (born 1961), Azerbaijani economist
Hamid Hajizadeh (1950–1998), Iranian poet
Mehdi Hajizadeh (born 1981), Iranian sport wrestler